William Ephraim Smith (March 14, 1829 – March 11, 1890) was a planter, lawyer, and politician from Georgia.

Biography
He was born in Augusta, Richmond County, Georgia.  In 1846, he was admitted to the Georgia bar, which required a special act of the Georgia legislature due to his youth.  He worked as a planter and practiced law in Albany, Dougherty County, Georgia, for most of the period 1846–1858.  In 1853, he was an ordinary of Dougherty County.  In 1858, Smith became the solicitor general of Georgia's southwest circuit, a post he held until 1860. The following year, the American Civil War broke out. Although opposed to secession, Smith enlisted in the Fourth Georgia Volunteer Infantry of the Confederate States Army as a lieutenant.  He became a captain in April 1862 and in June lost his right leg at the Battle of Oak Grove. In 1863, he was elected as a representative to the Second Confederate Congress.  His term as representative was cut short by the defeat of the Confederacy.

In 1874, Smith was offered and declined the office of circuit judge of Georgia; that same year, he was also elected as a representative to the United States Congress.  He served as a representative from March 4, 1875, through March 3, 1881.   After leaving office, Smith resumed the practice of law.  In 1886, Smith began a term as state senator and was also President of the Georgia Democratic Convention.  Smith left office in 1888 and died two years later in Albany.

References

Sources
 Retrieved on 2008-02-14

External links

1829 births
1890 deaths
Georgia (U.S. state) lawyers
Confederate States Army officers
Members of the Confederate House of Representatives from Georgia (U.S. state)
Democratic Party Georgia (U.S. state) state senators
American planters
Democratic Party members of the United States House of Representatives from Georgia (U.S. state)
American slave owners
19th-century American politicians
Politicians from Augusta, Georgia
19th-century American lawyers